Bruce Larson could refer to: 

Bruce Larson (basketball) (1926-2021), American basketball coach
Bruce Larson (racing driver) (born 1937), American drag racer

See also
Bruce Larsen, American sculptor